Katsikas is the largest village of the municipal unit Pamvotida, in the Ioannina regional unit, Epirus, northern Greece. Since the 2011 local government reform it is part of the municipality Ioannina. Its population is 3,885 (2011).

It was recognized in the community after the liberation of Ioannina six years later on August 7, 1919. But the village he became and from older times. The first people came and built the village around 1400, from villages of the Souli because they exile from the village elders of the Souli villages. The population as various state historian is constantly changing and always improving. In 1856 the Katsikas had 70 thatched cottages for families and their livestock to live in, an inn (chani) for the travellers to sleep and rest their animals and the Churches of the Taxiarches.

When first founded, the village was certainly not known by the name Katsikas, and opinions differ about the classification have been written yet and traditions. Tradition says that the name comes from someone who was guarding goats say "Katsikas". Other tradition says that the holy man is live in the monastery and his name is Katsikas, and then he died and is buried in the church garden. Residents in the Katsikas are called Katskiots if a man, or Katskiotsa if a woman, and Katskoplu if a child.

After the war of the 1940 the village was occupied day and the night by the Italians (9 April 1941) in the beginning but later (1 November 1944) the Germans and then the Communists. These people they put in prison and killed not only criminals and animal thieves, but also good people and family men. But then, after nine years of oppression, the Katiskas became a free village. Today it is a small town and centre of the City Pambvotis.

The villagers are farmers, poultry and other urban occupations. Some women work in bars such as Johnny bar and Lialios, which is very famous and popular to the soldiers. Katsikas very old had attained educational level. During the Turkish occupation the teacher pay their own residents and the Cathedral. In committee for paying schools (eforia) were many learned men of old times, like Markos Ypsilantis, Anastasios Tositsas and Manthos Kallergis. From Katsikas came scientist Dimitris Maroulis, born in 1840. He graduated from the Zosimaia school and then attended the University of Athens and then studied in Germany. When he finished his studies, he returned to live in Serres, where he worked in the Didaskaleio of the Serres (a big school). He never returned to Katsikas because of an incident with local priest who called him satan because he wrote that there is no God, it is only a belief. Today his statue is in the main town square (plateia). He is sitting at a big desk, and is holding a book, and next to him is the goat, a symbol of the city where he was born. He wrote many scientific papers and one of them was 'On the bringing up of Greek teachers on pot' printed in Athens in 1888. Fair boasts residents of Katsika for the man who jumped in the era of obscurantism.

From then, many residents of Katsikas learned to read, also the women. Today, in Katsikas are two primary schools (dhemotika), one small children high school (gimnasio) and one senior high school (lykeio), but the government plans to close the Lykeio because many students did not write well the Panellinies examinations. Newspaper To Sfirodrepano wrote that this plan is a crime of the bourgeois state, oppressing poor farmers and workers of Katsikas. Is also in Katsikas, there is a milk processing school.

Sights
 The Church of the Archangels (1411). This is a beautiful church worthy of attention. This church is the seat of the local bishop, and they sometimes call it for this reason 'Metropolis'. The church celebrates every year on the Day of Archangels Michael and Gabriel, i.e. November 19.
 The Church of the Madonna or the Sleep of the Mother of God that built in 1812 in place of old church that burned the sinners in old times. Next door is and the graveyard of the village. This church celebrates every year on 15 August (the Easter of the Summer).
 The Church of the Holy Friday of the 1838. This is a temple that was built by the shoemakers and the tailors of Ioannina.
 The Church of the Holy Dimitrios of the 1838. This is beautiful church where was priest the famous Papatsakalos when he begin to be priest (begin of his career). In this church he made famous saying to protect Christians from the thieves, the Turks and the gays. The Church celebrates every year on the day of St. Dhimetrios (26 October)
 The Church of the Holy Apostoli was built c. 1780 and rebuilt in 1833.

References

City Pamvotida

Populated places in Ioannina (regional unit)